The Secrets of Quantum Physics is a two-part British television series outlining the theories of quantum mechanics and quantum biology, described as "a brilliant guide" to a "jaw-dropping world".

Episodes

Reception 

Julia Raeside, writing in The Guardian, states that while Al-Khalili started gently with innocuous chat he soon led audiences down a rabbit hole of true scientific bewilderment, creating a bona fide head-breaker from start to sensational finish. Gary Rose, writing in the RadioTimes notes that Al-Khalili, who touched on the topic in his earlier series Atom, takes the subject to a deeper level.

Al-Khalili, who is emphatic and engaging, performed low-fi demonstrations with simple props, such as coins, gloves and cocktail paraphernalia, to explain mind-melting concepts clearly.

Andrew Mueller, also writing in The Guardian, concludes that the series does what all good science journalism does, prompt the viewer to look at the world with a different and renewed appreciation.

References

External links 
 
 

2014 British television series debuts
2014 British television series endings
BBC high definition shows
BBC television documentaries about history
BBC television documentaries about science
British documentary films
British documentary television series
Documentary films about the history of science
Historical television series
English-language television shows